Dragana Cvijić (born 15 March 1990) is a Serbian handball player for Ferencvárosi TC and the Serbian national team.

International honours
EHF Champions League:
Winner: 2012 , 2015World Championship:Finalist'': 2013

Individual awards
 Balkan-Handball.com Serbian Handballer of the Year: 2015, 2018
All-Star Pivot of the World Championship: 2013
All-Star Pivot of the EHF Champions League: 2018
 Team of the Tournament Pivot of the Bucharest Trophy: 2014,2015

References

External links

Living people
1990 births
Handball players from Belgrade
Serbian female handball players
Mediterranean Games gold medalists for Serbia
Competitors at the 2013 Mediterranean Games
Expatriate handball players
Serbian expatriate sportspeople in Montenegro
Serbian expatriate sportspeople in North Macedonia
Serbian expatriate sportspeople in Romania
Serbian expatriate sportspeople in Slovenia
Mediterranean Games medalists in handball
Competitors at the 2009 Mediterranean Games